The Trinity Church (alternate, "German Church") is located at Karlskrona in Blekinge,  Sweden. Along with the Karlskrona Admiralty Church (Amiralitetskyrkan), the church is situated in the main square, (Stortorget), at the center of the island of Trossö.

The church was built in Baroque architecture for the town's German-speaking  population. The first foundation stone was set in 1697. The church was inaugurated on June 27, 1709.  The church was designed by  architect  Nicodemus Tessin the Younger 1654–1728). The structure includes a domed rotunda. At the time of the citywide fire in Karlskrona in 1790 the church burned and  only the walls remained. The church was rebuilt after the original drawings.

After the fire in 1790, only the severely damaged outer walls remained. In 1791, architect Olof Tempelman (1745-1816) was commissioned to draw up proposals for the reconstruction of the church. His simplification of architectural details for the exterior of the church resulted in a building  with Neoclassical architecture style. In 1802, the church was re-inauguration. In 1814, the church  interior was completed. The principal responsible for this work was Admiralty sculptor Johan Törnström (1743-1828). Most notably he created both the altarpiece and pulpit for the Church.

The church was listed as part of the Naval Port of Karlskrona on the UNESCO World Heritage List in 1998.

Gallery

References

Churches in Blekinge County
Churches in the Diocese of Lund
18th-century Church of Sweden church buildings
Karlskrona